A pentaiodide is a compound or ion that contains five iodine atoms or ions. Some examples include:

pentaiodide - the anion I5−
Niobium pentaiodide - NbI5, which exists as a dimer
Tantalum pentaiodide - TaI5, which exists as a dimer
Protactinium pentaiodide - PaI5

See also 
 Polyiodide

Iodine compounds